The Playas Valley is a lengthy and narrow 60-mi (97-km) long, valley located in Hidalgo County, New Mexico in the Bootheel Region; the extreme south of the valley lies in Chihuahua. Playas, NM is located in the northeast. The valley is noteworthy for the Playas Lake, (dry lake) in the north.

The Continental Divide of the Americas forms its western border in a series of three linear mountain ranges, and the divide forms the water divide as the northern border of the Playas Valley. The valley disappears southward into regions of the northwest Chihuahuan Desert of Chihuahua, Mexico. Regions of the desert extend northward to foothills of various mountain ranges, canyons, washes, or other landforms.

Description
The Playas Valley is linear, and north–south trending and surrounded by mountain ranges, except on the south, where the flatlands merge into the Chihuahuan Desert.

West
Pyramid Mountains
Animas Mountains
San Luis Mountains

East
Little Hatchet Mountains
Big Hatchet Mountains
Alamo Hueco Mountains

Playas Lake and the valley

Much of the drainage into Playas Valley does not end in a playa or dry lake. In the southern half to two thirds of the valley, the valley has mostly dry washes that do not reach the valley flatlands.

Playas Lake is a linear dry lake, about 10 mi long, and only 4 mi west of Playas, NM. An even smaller dry lake, about a tenth the size is just adjacent southwards. Both dry lakes are in the north, with the drainage coming from the continental divide as the perimeter of the valley, going north, then due west, then south as the southern ridgeline of the Pyramid Mountains. The divide makes up the southern region of the mountains, before it skirts lower peaks before reaching the north of the Animas Mountains.

References

External links
Playas Lake, Playas Lake Fishing in Hidalgo County (coordinates, elevation)

Great Divide of North America
New Mexico Bootheel
Landforms of Hidalgo County, New Mexico
Valleys of New Mexico
Valleys of Mexico
Landforms of Chihuahua (state)